M. Vasanthi is an Indian politician and was a Member of Parliament elected from Tamil Nadu. She was elected to the Lok Sabha from Tenkasi constituency as an Anna Dravida Munnetra Kazhagam candidate in 2014 election.

References 

All India Anna Dravida Munnetra Kazhagam politicians
Living people
India MPs 2014–2019
Lok Sabha members from Tamil Nadu
Women in Tamil Nadu politics
21st-century Indian women politicians
21st-century Indian politicians
1962 births
People from Tirunelveli district
People from Thoothukudi district